Arslan Khan (born 15 September 1999) is an Indian cricketer. He made his first-class debut on 9 December 2019, for Chandigarh in the 2019–20 Ranji Trophy. In the first innings of the match, Khan scored the first century by a batsman for Chandigarh in first-class cricket. He also scored his maiden double century in first-class cricket, with 233 not out. He made his Twenty20 debut on 17 January 2021, for Chandigarh in the 2020–21 Syed Mushtaq Ali Trophy. He made his List A debut on 21 February 2021, for Chandigarh in the 2020–21 Vijay Hazare Trophy.

References

External links
 

1999 births
Living people
Indian cricketers
Chandigarh cricketers
Place of birth missing (living people)